Aidan Will Barlow (born 10 January 2000) is an English professional footballer who plays as a left midfielder for Doncaster Rovers.

Club career
Barlow is a product of the Manchester United academy, having joined at the age of six. He made his first appearance at under-18 level in a defeat to Liverpool in 2014–15, prior to making the step up to under-23 football; he also featured for the under-19s in the UEFA Youth League. Barlow signed his first professional contract in December 2017.

On 13 August 2019, Barlow was loaned to Eliteserien side Tromsø until the end of the Norwegian season. He made his professional debut in Norway's top flight on 18 August, featuring for 76 minutes of a fixture with Lillestrøm. His first senior goal arrived in his third game, as he scored against Haugesund on 1 September. After a further goal versus Sarpsborg 08, he returned to his parent club on 3 December.

On 25 June 2020, it was announced that Barlow would leave Manchester United upon the expiration of his contract five days later. In September 2020, he went on trial at Stoke City, playing three games for their U23 side. In November 2020, he appeared for Ipswich Town's U23 side as a trialist. He went on another trial at Doncaster Rovers in July 2021, and signed a one-year contract with the club on 28 July 2021. Following relegation to League Two, Barlow signed a further one-year contract extension in May 2022 with the option for a following year.

International career
In May 2017, Barlow represented England at the UEFA Under-17 Championship in Croatia. He scored on his first appearance in the competition, netting in a 4–0 victory over Ukraine on 7 May. Barlow appeared in three of England's six games as they finished as runners-up to Spain. In the following September, Barlow played for the U18s in a friendly against South Africa U20s.

Career statistics
.

References

External links

2000 births
Living people
Footballers from Salford
English footballers
England youth international footballers
Association football midfielders
English expatriate footballers
Expatriate footballers in Norway
English expatriate sportspeople in Norway
Manchester United F.C. players
Tromsø IL players
Doncaster Rovers F.C. players
Eliteserien players
English Football League players